Aion is the fifth studio album by the Australian band Dead Can Dance, released on 11 June 1990 by 4AD. The first album Lisa Gerrard and Brendan Perry wrote after the end of their romantic partnership, it was recorded at Perry's new estate, Quivvy Church in Ireland, with additional recording on "The Arrival and the Reunion" and "The End of Words" taking place at Woodbine Street Recording Studios in Leamington Spa.

On this album, Dead Can Dance explored early music to a greater degree, including medieval music and Renaissance music, as Perry noted, "synonymous with the Bosch period"; this included pieces like the 14th-century Italian dance instrumental ("Saltarello") and 16th-century Catalan ballad ("The Song of the Sibyl"), lyrics from 17th-century Spanish baroque poet Luis de Góngora ("Fortune Presents Gifts Not According to the Book"), and instrumentation such as hurdy-gurdy and viols. The male soprano David Navarro Sust contributed vocals to tracks 1 and 7.

The album cover shows a detail from the Dutch painter Hieronymus Bosch's triptych The Garden of Earthly Delights (specifically, its central "Earth" panel).

Track listing

Personnel
Personnel adapted from Aion liner notes.
Dead Can Dance
 Lisa Gerrard – vocals, instrumentation, production
 Brendan Perry – vocals, instrumentation, production, design

Additional personnel
 David Navarro Sust – vocals (tracks 1 and 7)
 John Bonnar – keyboards (track 5), co-arrangements (tracks 2 and 5)
 Robert Perry – bagpipes (tracks 2 and 6)
 Andrew Robinson – bass viol (track 10)
 Anne Robinson – bass viol (track 10)
 Honor Carmody – tenor viol (track 10)
 Lucy Robinson – tenor viol (track 10)
 Luis de Góngora – words (track 5)

References

External links
 
 

1990 albums
Dead Can Dance albums
4AD albums